Björn Hlynur Haraldsson (born 8 December 1974) is an Icelandic actor and director. Björn was born in Reykjavík, Iceland, and graduated from the Icelandic Arts Academy in 2001. He co-founded the theatre company Vesturport the same year. In spring of 2015, he starred in the psychological thriller TV series Fortitude. He has previously been noted for roles in the films Eleven Men Out and Jar City. Most recently he appeared as King Eist in Netflix’s adaptation of The Witcher, as Pétur in the A24 horror film Lamb and as Rikki in Cop Secret.

Notable film and television roles

References

External links

Living people
1974 births
21st-century Icelandic male actors
Icelandic male television actors
Icelandic male film actors
Male actors from Reykjavík